Kristjan Järvi (alternate (U.S.) spelling: Kristian Järvi) (born 13 June 1972) is an Estonian American conductor, composer and producer. Born in Tallinn, Estonia, he is the younger son of the conductor Neeme Järvi and brother of conductor Paavo Järvi and flutist Maarika Järvi.

Early life
When Järvi was age 7, his family immigrated to the United States and settled in Shrewsbury, New Jersey. He became an American citizen in 1985.  He grew up in New York City.  Järvi studied piano with Nina Svetlanova at the Manhattan School of Music.  He later went on to study conducting at the University of Michigan under Kenneth Kiesler.

Career
From 1998 to 2000, Järvi was Assistant Conductor to Esa-Pekka Salonen at the Los Angeles Philharmonic.  He and the composer Gene Pritsker co-founded the Absolute Ensemble, based in New York City, in 1993, with Järvi as its music director.  In 2007, Järvi and the Absolute Ensemble were awarded the Deutsche Bank Prize for Outstanding Artistic Achievement.
 
Järvi was Chief Conductor and Music Director of NorrlandsOperan from 2000 to 2004. From 2004 to 2009, Järvi was Chief Conductor and Music Director of the Tonkünstler Orchestra, Vienna.  Järvi is also the current Artistic Advisor to the Kammerorchester Basel and the conductor and founder of the Baltic Sea Philharmonic (formerly Baltic Youth Philharmonic).  In April 2011, Järvi was appointed the next chief conductor of the MDR Symphony Orchestra effective with the 2012-2013 season, with an initial contract of 3 years.  His MDR contract was extended in 2015.  In March 2017, the MDR announced that is to conclude his MDR Symphony Orchestra after the close of the 2017-2018 season.

In addition to a Grammy nomination, Järvi has previously been awarded the German Record Critics Prize and a Swedish Grammy for the recording of Hilding Rosenberg's opera "Isle of Bliss". He has recorded Leonard Bernstein's Mass with the Tonkünstler Orchestra and Absolute Ensemble.  While Järvi's repertoire includes pieces from the Classic and Romantic periods, he is also a specialist for 20th-century composers and contemporary music, having commissioned works by Arvo Pärt, Heinz Karl Gruber, Erkki-Sven Tüür, Ezequiel Viñao, Peeter Vähi, Dave Soldier, Joe Zawinul and Gediminas Gelgotas among others. In 2014, Järvi and the French record label Naïve Classique launched the 'Kristjan Järvi Sound Project', an ongoing series featuring recordings from all of Järvi's ensembles.

Järvi defies musical orthodoxy and pursues his pioneering ideas and concepts with three bands and orchestras: Together with Gene Pritsker he co-founded the New York-based classical-hip-hop-jazz group “Absolute Ensemble”. Järvi is founder-conductor and artistic director of the “Baltic Sea Philharmonic” and he is leader of the “Sunbeam Production” in-house band “Nordic Pulse.

As a recording artist Järvi has more than 60 albums to his credit, from Hollywood soundtracks such as “Cloud Atlas”, “Sense 8” (both productions of the Wachowski sisters), “Hologram for the King” (directed by Tom Tykwer) and award-winning albums on Sony Classical and Chandos, to his eponymous series: the “Kristjan Järvi Sound Project” and recording for Max Richter.

In 2016 Kristjan Järvi started his own Production Company Sunbeam Productions in order to being able to bring unique live music experiences to his audiences. Kristjan recently signed a record deal with BMG – Modern Recordings. Where in 2020 he released his first own Album “Nordic Escapes”

After “Snow Maiden” and “Swan Lake”, Kristjan´s own arrangements of Tchaikovsky´s Theatre Works  series on Sony Classical takes off with its third release: “Sleeping Beauty”. Next releases will be “The Nutcracker”

Composer
As a composer Järvi have active many compositions, of modern style and some composed with the german composer Johnny Klimek of Klimek-Tykwer-Heil fame, and some for orchestra, vocal, chorus or synth instruments. Some of his partial compositions are:

 Rattle, with Johnny Klimek (2019)
 Pendleonium, with Johnny Klimek (2019)
 NEBULA (2019)
 Kritical Mass (2018)
 Babylon Charleston (2018), for the series Babylon Berlin. 
His latest Album is: Nordic Escapes , released in August 2020 on Modern Recordings (BMG)

References

External links
 Kristjan Järvi official website
 
 Dorn Music GmbH agency page on Kristjan Järvi
 Absolute Ensemble official site

Bibliography
Järvi, Kristjan (2014): "A Soundtrack to Our Lives..." . In: Stoppe, Sebastian (ed.), Film in Concert: Film Scores and their Relation to Classical Concert Music, pp. 131–144. .

1972 births
Estonian conductors (music)
Estonian emigrants to the United States
Living people
Manhattan School of Music alumni
Musicians from New Jersey
Musicians from New York City
Musicians from Tallinn
People from Rumson, New Jersey
University of Michigan School of Music, Theatre & Dance alumni
21st-century conductors (music)